The 2015 Collegiate Rugby Championship was a college rugby sevens tournament held May 30—31 at PPL Park, a soccer stadium in the Chester suburb of Philadelphia, PA. It was the sixth annual Collegiate Rugby Championship (CRC), and the fifth consecutive year that the tournament was held at PPL Park. The tournament is known for sponsorship reasons as the 2015 Penn Mutual Collegiate Rugby Championship.

Qualifying
Several of the 2015 CRC teams were invited to play, but three teams reached the 2015 CRC via conference qualifying tournaments and one via the national  Las Vegas Invitational qualifying tournament:
 Southeastern conference 7s champion: Alabama
 Big Ten conference 7s champion: Indiana
 Atlantic Coast conference 7s champion: Virginia Tech
 Las Vegas Invitational: Arkansas State

University of California, the defending champion from 2013 and 2014, entered the tournament as the favorite, due to the strength and depth of their squad.

Pool stage

Pool A

Pool B

Pool C

Pool D

Pool E

Knockout stage

Shield

Bowl

Plate

Cup

Players

Leading scorers
Source:

References

2015
2015 rugby union tournaments for clubs
2015 in American rugby union
2015 rugby sevens competitions